The 1917 Charlestown Navy Yard football team was an American football team that represented the United States Navy's Charlestown Navy Yard, also known as Boston Navy Yard, during the 1917 football season.

Halfback Eddie Casey was selected as a first-team halfback on Walter Camp's 1917 All-Service football team.

Schedule

References

Charlestown Navy Yard
Charlestown Navy Yard football